The 2002 CFL Draft took place on Thursday, April 25, 2002. From a list of 442 eligible CIS football players from Canadian universities and Canadian players in the NCAA and NAIA, 54 players were chosen, including 26 players from Canadian Interuniversity Sport institutions.

This year's draft saw an increase in picks from 48 in 2001 to 54 with the addition of the Ottawa Renegades to the league for the 2002 season. Ottawa was given the first selection in each round, including another bonus selection with the first overall pick.

Forfeitures 
 Saskatchewan forfeited their first-round pick after selecting Andrew Moore in the 2001 Supplemental Draft.

Round one

Round two

Round three

Round four

Round five

Round six

Notes

Further reading 
 
 
 

Canadian College Draft
Cfl Draft, 2002